Josef may refer to
Josef (given name)
Josef (surname)
Josef (film), a 2011 Croatian war film
Musik Josef, a Japanese manufacturer of musical instruments